Vancouver Community College is a public community college in Vancouver, British Columbia, Canada. Founded in 1965, it is the largest and oldest community college in British Columbia, offering 91 certificate programs, 31 diploma programs, and 3 bachelor's degree programs. VCC has two campuses: Broadway and Downtown.

The college accommodates 26,000 students each year from a variety of nations, about 8 percent of whom are international students.

History
Vancouver Community College was established as Vancouver City College in 1965 through a merger of four local educational institutions: the Vancouver Vocational Institute, the Vancouver School of Art, the Vancouver School Board's Night School Program, and the King Edward Senior Matriculation and Continuing Education Centre. Classes were initially held in the facilities of the King Edward Centre. In 1970, the college opened a campus in the Langara neighbourhood, which became an independent college in 1994.

Vancouver City College was renamed as Vancouver Community College in 1974, when it separated from the Vancouver School Board. In 1983, the main campus was moved from the King Edward Centre location at 12th Avenue and Oak Street to its current location at 1155 Broadway, now known as the Broadway campus. The present Downtown campus comprises the former facilities of the Vancouver Vocational Institute.

Campus
Vancouver Community College has two campuses, which are accessible by Vancouver's SkyTrain. The Downtown campus is located at 200-block Dunsmuir at Hamilton (two blocks west of Stadium–Chinatown station) in Downtown Vancouver. VCC's second campus, known as the Broadway campus, is at 1155 East Broadway, by the VCC–Clark station. VCC also has nearly three dozen community outreach and learning centres.

January 2009 marked the opening of VCC's $55 million Broadway campus expansion project. $44 million was funded by the Government of British Columbia and the balance by VCC and community donors.

From 2014 to 2022, VCC shared facility space with BCIT on Annacis Island, where both institutions offered programming in heavy mechanical trades. In 2022, VCC closed programming at its Annacis Island campus, transitioning the majority of its heavy duty programs to BCIT and moving the remaining programs to its Broadway campus.

Governance
Vancouver Community College is a public institution of post-secondary education administered by a Board of Governors, on behalf of the Government of British Columbia and the Ministry of Advanced Education and Labour Market Development. The board determines policy and reviews the college's performance as detailed in the College and Institutes Act. It also has primary responsibility for fostering the college's short- and long-term success.

The VCC Board of Directors consists of eight members appointed by government along with the VCC president, the Chair of Education Council and four elected Board members, including one faculty representative, one support staff representative, and two student representatives.  VCC was the only institution to hold the distinction of having the support staff representative act as board chair.

Staff and faculty
CUPE Local 4627 Vancouver Community College Employees' Union (VCCEU), a trade union, not an association, represents approximately 600 support staff at Vancouver Community College and is covered by the CUPE Support Staff Collective Agreement (CUPE Local 4627).  CUPE local 4627 workers provide services in: instruction, program assistance, finance, Aboriginal, administrative, bookstore, library, communication, food services, laboratory demonstration, research, IT, print, and media technology.  VCCEU was formed in 2003 and represents the technical employees, warehousemen, program assistants and cafeteria workers in the Food Trades division of the VCC. CUPE 4627 held their first strike in November 2012 with 96% support for a strike and successfully ratified a new agreement in March 2013 with no concessions and did not agree to the formulary.

On February 27, 1951, the Labour Board certified a bargaining unit of instructors, counselors, and librarians in programs conducted by and at Vancouver Vocational Institute. That bargaining unit was called the Vocational Instructors' Association. This unit continues at VCC.  The Vancouver Community College Faculty Association (VCCFA) represents approximately 750 instructors, counselors, librarians, and health nurses working in Metro Vancouver. VCCFA is a member of the Federation of Post Secondary Educators of B.C. (FPSE Local 15).  Employment for instructors, librarians, counselors, and department heads is covered by the Faculty Association Collective Agreement.

Academics
VCC offers career programs leading to one-year certificates, two-year diplomas, and four-year bachelor's degrees in fields such as the arts, business, trades, and health sciences. The college offers both full-time and part-time programs in spring, summer, and fall terms. Individual courses are also available to supplement high school education or offer continuing education.

Student life
Many of Vancouver Community College's programs require students to train in local businesses and facilities to gain practical skills. A number of these are located on campus, open to students and the general public. JJ's Dining Room at the downtown campus, is run by culinary arts students. The Four Corners restaurant and the Seiffert Market are run by VCC hospitality management students. The Broadway and Downtown campuses have several coffee and snack kiosks as well as full-service cafeterias. The VCC salon at the Downtown campus offers hairstyling and esthetics services from students learning in the Hair Design and esthetics programs.

Student government
The Students' Union of Vancouver Community College (SUVCC) was formed in 1974. Based at the Downtown campus, its goal is to provide and encourage access to recreation, events, and opportunities for VCC students. SUVCC also offers students a health and dental plan and low cost access to student services. It is a member of the Canadian Federation of Students and participates in the British Columbia U-Pass programme.

Student services
VCC is accessible to students with disabilities who study in either specialized programs or in mainstream programs. Access to equipment and braille or taped class material is available. VCC also provides sign language interpreting or TypeWell services for Deaf, hard-of-hearing and DeafBlind students for all educational needs. Advisors can provide exam accommodation, job search assistance, and community resource referrals. The college also offers on-site licensed, non-profit child care, professional counselling, and on-site health services with a doctor at each campus. International students can access educational planning, study permit extensions, and obtain medical insurance and applications for work permits.

Aboriginal services
VCC is a member of the Coastal Corridor Consortium, which works to improve levels of participation and success for Aboriginal students. The Consortium includes the Lil'wat Nation, Musqueam Nation, Sechelt Nation, Squamish Nation, Tsleil-Waututh Nation, United Native Nations, Métis Nation British Columbia, Capilano University, Native Education College.

VCC has a specialized Aboriginal Education and Services department to provide a range of services for Aboriginal students including academic and personal support and referrals, cultural workshops and Elder support. The Broadway and Downtown campuses both have unique areas classified Aboriginal Gathering Spaces. Aboriginal Elders are on site at each campus to help students with studies and counseling.

Notable alumni
Kevin Cherkas

See also
List of institutes and colleges in British Columbia
List of universities in British Columbia
Higher education in British Columbia
Education in Canada

References

External links

Educational institutions established in 1965
Universities and colleges in Vancouver
Colleges in British Columbia
Vocational education in Canada
1965 establishments in British Columbia